Madhuwan is a municipality located in Bardiya District of Lumbini Province of Nepal. It is one out of six municipality of Bardiya District. The municipality is surrounded by Gulariya and Barbardiya in the east, India borders from the west, Thakurbaba and Geruwa Rural Municipality in the north. Bardiya National Park touches the border of the municipality by north.

The municipality is divided into total 9 wards.

Background
The municipality was established on 2 December 2014, when the government announced 61 more new municipalities. This new municipality was established merging the two then VDCs, e.g. Sanoshree and Taratal and this new municipality was named Sanoshree Taratal. On 10 March 2017 two more VDCs Suryapatawa and Dhodhari Incorporated with this municipality and renamed it to Madhuwan.

Demographics
At the time of the 2011 Nepal census, Madhuwan Municipality had a population of 46,682. Of these, 52.8% spoke Nepali, 42.2% Tharu, 1.4% Gurung, 1.1% Magar, 0.7% Tamang, 0.7% Raji, 0.2% Hindi, 0.2% Maithili, 0.2% Urdu and 0.5% other languages as their first language.

In terms of ethnicity/caste, 42.8% were Tharu, 19.3% Chhetri, 9.5% Kami, 8.1% Hill Brahmin, 5.6% Magar, 3.0% Gurung, 2.1% Thakuri, 2.1% Damai/Dholi, 1.5% Sarki and 6.0% others.

In terms of religion, 92.3% were Hindu, 3.7% Christian, 3.3% Buddhism and 0.6% Muslim and 0.1% others.

See also
Bardiya District
Lumbini Province

References

Municipalities in Lumbini Province
Nepal municipalities established in 2014
Municipalities in Bardiya District